Capitanía General de San Fernando is an institution of the Spanish Armada, located in San Fernando in the Province of Cádiz, Andalusia, Spain. It was moved from Cadiz to San Fernando in 1769, and then relocated to its current location at the end of the Calle Real in the year 1917.

References

Buildings and structures in San Fernando, Cádiz
Museums in Andalusia
Spanish Armada